Nicolas Jacobsen is a hacker who had illegal access to the private information of T-Mobile customers for at least a year. He was arrested after an investigation by the United States Secret Service in October 2004 and pleaded guilty at trial as part of a plea agreement.

Jacobsen's cyber targets were reported to include Paris Hilton's T-Mobile Sidekick II, in addition to exposing documents emailed to an agent by the Secret Service.

References

Deutsche Telekom
American computer criminals
Living people
Year of birth missing (living people)